Estheria may refer to:
 Estheria (crustacean), a genus from the Carboniferous period
 Estheria (fly), a genus of tachinid flies in the family Tachinidae